is an action-adventure game series created, produced and directed by Yu Suzuki. Shenmue (1999) and Shenmue II (2001) were developed by Sega AM2 and published by Sega for Dreamcast. Shenmue III, developed by Suzuki's company Ys Net, was released for PlayStation 4 and Windows in 2019.

The Shenmue games consist of open-world 3D environments interspersed with brawler battles and quick time events. They include elements of role-playing, life simulation and social simulation games, such as a day-and-night system, variable weather effects, non-player characters with daily schedules, and interactive elements such as vending machines, arcades, and minigames. The story follows the teenage martial artist Ryo Hazuki as he travels through 1980s Japan and China in pursuit of his father's killer. The original Shenmue was the most expensive video game ever developed at the time, with an estimated production and marketing cost of US$47 to $70 million, though some of the development also covered Shenmue II.

Shenmue I and II received mostly positive reviews; critics praised its graphics, soundtrack, realism and ambition, but criticized their controls, slow pace and voice acting, and their realism and focus on mundane detail divided players. They attracted a cult following, appearing in several lists of the greatest video games of all time, and are credited for pioneering game systems including quick time events and open worlds. However, the games were commercial failures and further installments entered development hell.

In 2004, Sega announced a spin-off massively multiplayer online role-playing game, Shenmue Online, but it was not released. In 2010, a social game, Shenmue City, was launched in Japan; it was shut down a year later. In 2018, Sega released high-definition ports of Shenmue and Shenmue II for multiple formats. Following a successful crowdfunding campaign, Suzuki developed Shenmue III independently; it was released for PlayStation 4 and Windows in 2019, and received mixed reviews. An anime adaptation of Shenmue, co-produced by Crunchyroll and Adult Swim, premiered in February 2022.

History

Shenmue and Shenmue II 

The creator of Shenmue, Yu Suzuki, joined Sega in 1983 and created several successful arcade games, including Hang-On (1985), Out Run (1986) and Virtua Fighter (1993). In comparison to arcade games, where the ideal experience was only a few minutes long, Suzuki wanted to make a longer experience. In 1996, he and Sega AM2 began developing a Saturn RPG based on the Virtua Fighter series.

In 1997, development moved to Sega's upcoming console, the Dreamcast, and the Virtua Fighter connection was dropped. By the time of the Dreamcast's release in Japan in November 1998, the game had been titled Shenmue. Sega advertised Shenmue as belonging to a new genre it termed "full reactive eyes entertainment" or "FREE". It became the most expensive game ever developed at the time, reported to have cost US$70 million; in 2011, Suzuki said the figure was closer to $47 million including marketing. The development also covered some of Shenmue II (2001), which was completed for a smaller figure, and possibly groundwork for future Shenmue games.

Shenmue was released on December 29, 1999 in Japan, November 8, 2000 in North America, and December 1, 2000 in Europe. Shenmue II was released for Dreamcast in 2001 in Japan and Europe only; an Xbox port followed in 2002 in Japan, Europe and North America. Despite attracting positive reviews and a cult following, neither game made a profit and Shenmue III entered a period of development hell lasting over a decade.

Shenmue Online and Shenmue City 
Suzuki worked on various projects which failed to see release, including Shenmue Online, a PC MMORPG announced in 2004. He established his own development company, Ys Net, in 2008 and left Sega in 2011. In 2010, Sega announced Shenmue City, a social game for the Mobage service. It was not released outside Japan and was shut down in December 2011.

Shenmue III and ports 

During Sony's presentation at the E3 conference on June 15, 2015, Suzuki announced a Kickstarter crowdfunding campaign for Shenmue III, having licensed the series from Sega. Shenmue III became the fastest-funded and the highest-funded video game project in Kickstarter history, reaching its initial $2 million goal in just over nine hours, and earning $6.3 million in total. It was released on 19 November 2019 for PlayStation 4 and Windows.

Sega began developing remasters of Shenmue I and II featuring new models, textures and lighting, but it was canceled in 2017. Sega said that "working with original animations and characters but meshing them with enhanced HD visuals gave us a game that we felt would not meet the standards that Shenmue fans expect and deserve". Instead, in August 2018, Sega released high-definition ports for Windows, PlayStation 4 and Xbox One.<ref>{{Cite news |last=Robinson |first=Martin |date=3 July 2018 |title=Shenmue'''s HD re-release gets a final date |language=en |work=Eurogamer |url=https://www.eurogamer.net/articles/2018-07-03-shenmues-hd-re-release-gets-a-final-date |access-date=2018-07-05}}</ref> The ports include new graphics and control options, improved user interfaces, and Japanese and English voices. Some details, such as product placement, are omitted, and cutscenes are presented in their original aspect ratio due to technical limitations.<ref name="Linneman">{{cite web |last=Linneman |first=John |date=21 August 2018 |title=Shenmue's HD remasters analysed: enhancements are sparse but the ports are solid gold |url=https://www.eurogamer.net/articles/digitalfoundry-2018-shenmue-hd-remasters-tech-analysis |url-status=live |archive-url=https://web.archive.org/web/20180821171319/https://www.eurogamer.net/articles/digitalfoundry-2018-shenmue-hd-remasters-tech-analysis |archive-date=August 21, 2018 |access-date=22 August 2018 |work=Eurogamer |df=mdy-all}}</ref>

 Later projects 
In 2015, Suzuki said he hoped the series would cover four or five games. Shenmue III includes a letter to fans from Suzuki expressing his hope to develop Shenmue IV. In 2020, Suzuki told IGN he had created Shenmue III "for the fans", and that he planned to give Shenmue IV more mainstream appeal.

Gameplay
In the Shenmue games, the player controls teenage martial arts pupil Ryo Hazuki as he investigates his father's murder. The player explores the Yokosuka, Hong Kong and Guilin open worlds, searching for clues, examining objects and talking to non-player characters for information. The games feature a 3D fighting system similar to Sega's Virtua Fighter series; Ryo can fight multiple opponents at once, and can practice moves to increase their power. In quick time events, the player must press the right combination of buttons at the right moment to succeed.Shenmue I and II feature a level of detail considered unprecedented for games at the time of their release. Shops open and close, buses run to timetables, and characters have their own routines, each in accordance with the game's persistent clock. Ryo receives a daily allowance which can be spent on objects including food, raffle tickets, audio cassettes and capsule toys. There are several minigames; for example, Ryo can throw darts or play complete versions of Sega arcade games. He can earn money from minigames including driving forklift trucks, gambling, arm wrestling, fishing, and street fighting. The Dreamcast version of Shenmue II allow the player to import their save data from Shenmue, carrying over money, inventory items and martial arts moves.

 Plot IGN described Shenmue as a "revenge epic in the tradition of Chinese cinema". According to Suzuki, the three games cover around 40% of the story he has planned.

 Shenmue 

In 1986 Yokosuka, Japan, teenage martial artist Ryo Hazuki returns to his family dojo to witness a confrontation between his father Iwao and a Chinese man, Lan Di. Lan Di demands Iwao give him a mysterious stone artifact, the dragon mirror. When he threatens to kill Ryo, Iwao tells him the mirror is buried under the cherry blossom tree outside. As Lan Di's men dig up the mirror, Lan Di mentions Zhao Sunming, whom Iwao allegedly killed in Mengcun, China. Lan Di delivers a finishing blow and Iwao dies in Ryo's arms.

Ryo's investigation leads him to Master Chen in the Yokosuka harbor. Through Chen and his son Guizhang, Ryo learns that the dragon mirror taken by Lan Di is one of two mirrors. He locates the second, the phoenix mirror, in a basement hidden beneath his father's dojo. He defeats a local gang connected to Lan Di's organization, and Master Chen tells him to seek the aid of Master Xiuying in Hong Kong. Ryo boards a boat to China.

 Shenmue II 

In Hong Kong, Ryo finds Master Xiuying Hong, but she refuses to help him, considering his quest for vengeance reckless. Ryo teams up with a gang leader, Wuying Ren, a free-spirited motorcyclist, Joy, and a street boy, Wong, to find Yuanda Zhu, who sent Ryo's father a letter warning him of Lan Di's intentions.

Ryo and his allies locate Zhu in Kowloon Walled City, but are ambushed by the criminal Yellow Head organization and Zhu is kidnapped. Ryo rescues Zhu as Lan Di departs by helicopter. Zhu reveals that Lan Di killed Ryo's father because he believes Iwao killed his own father. Zhu also reveals that the mirrors will lead to the resurrection of the Qing Dynasty, the last imperial dynasty of China. Zhu advises Ryo to continue his search in the village of Bailu in Guilin, where Lan Di is also heading.

In Guilin, Ryo meets a teenage girl, Shenhua Ling, whose family is connected to the legacy of the dragon and phoenix mirrors. She leads Ryo to a stone quarry on the village outskirts to meet her father, but discovers he is missing.

 Shenmue III 

Ryo learns that Lan Di's father, Zhao Sunming, once visited Bailu with Ryo's father to train under the local grandmaster. Zhao died under mysterious circumstances several years later. Ryo also discovers that the phoenix and dragon mirrors were created by Shenhua's great-grandfather at the request of the Chinese emperor.

Ryo and Shenhua learn that Shenhua's father, Yuan, has been kidnapped by a local gang looking for the phoenix mirror. Ryo defeats two of the thugs, but is defeated by their boss, Yanlang. He convinces Sun, a local martial arts master, to teach him a powerful Bajiquan move, and uses it to defeat Yanlang. A village elder helps them discover a map to the treasure connected to the mirrors. Ryo fends off an attack from Chai, who reveals that Yuan and Xu have been taken to the city of Niaowu.

In Niaowu, Ryo and Shenhua learn that a local gang, the Red Snakes, is holding Yuan and Xu hostage. Shenhua is tricked by a Chi You Men leader, Niao Sun. Ryo and his allies infiltrate the Chi You Men's castle and rescue Shenhua and her father. Ryo confronts Lan Di, but Lan Di easily defeats him. Niao Sun betrays Lan Di, and has her men burn the castle. Ryo, Ren and Shenhua continue their journey along the Great Wall of China.

Reception

The Shenmue series has received mostly positive reviews and has attracted a cult following, with Shenmue I and II appearing in several "greatest video games of all time" lists. Shenmue III, released almost two decades later, received mixed reviews for its similarity to earlier games; some critics described it as outdated, while others praised its faithfulness to the franchise. The series has received praise for its graphics, soundtrack, realism and ambition, but criticism for its controls, slow pace and voice acting; its realism and focus on mundane detail has divided players.Shenmue is credited for pioneering several game technologies; its large environments, wealth of options and level of detail have been compared to later open-world games including the Grand Theft Auto series, the Yakuza series, Fallout 3 (2008), and Deadly Premonition (2010).Shenmue: Creator Yu Suzuki Speaks Out , GamesTM Shenmue is also credited for naming and popularizing the quick time event in modern games, which was featured in the Resident Evil, God of War, and Tomb Raider series.

Music
Several Shenmue soundtracks have been released. A promotional album, Shenmue Juke Box, was packaged with the limited edition of the original game in Japan and North America, containing ten select tracks from the in-game cassette tapes.

A soundtrack for the first game, Shenmue OST: Chapter 1: Yokosuka, was released in 2000. In September 2015, Data Discs released the Shenmue soundtrack on vinyl in three separate colored editions. In March 2016, the music of Shenmue was voted into the Classic FM Hall of Fame in 144th place.

Television series

An anime adaptation of Shenmue was announced on September 4, 2020, at the virtual Crunchyroll Expo. It premiered on simultaneously on February 6, 2022, on the U.S. network Adult Swim's Toonami programming block and the streaming platform Crunchyroll in English dub and Japanese sub, respectively. The series is directed by Sakurai Chikara, with Suzuki as executive producer, and adapts the events of the first two games. It was animated by Telecom Animation Film, with production management by Sola Entertainment.

Other appearances
Ryo Hazuki is a playable character in Sega's mascot racer Sonic & Sega All-Stars Racing. Ryo rides Naoyuki's motorbike and his special move features him driving a forklift, referencing his job at the Yokosuka Harbor. A second version of Ryo that only rides the forklift was released as downloadable content. In 2012, Steve Lycett, executive producer of Sumo Digital, encouraged a fan-made poll on the Sega forums to determine which three Sega characters the fans would like to see in Sonic & All-Stars Racing Transformed as downloadable content (DLC). Out of the 28 Sega characters chosen by the forum, Ryo Hazuki had the majority vote ranking 1st, while Hatsune Miku ranked 2nd, and Segata Sanshiro ranked 3rd. 

On January 1, 2014, SEGA announced that Ryo will appear in the iOS and Android versions of Sonic & All Stars Racing Transformed which was released on January 2. On January 14, Ryo became available for purchase as DLC on Steam for the PC version of Sonic and All Stars Racing Transformed. In this game, Ryo rides an arcade-themed vehicle that switches between OutRun, Hang-On, and Space Harrier'' arcade cabinets depending on its form.

Notes

References

External links
 
 Official Shenmue I & II website
 Official Shenmue III website

 
Sega Games franchises
Video games designed by Yu Suzuki
Video game franchises introduced in 1999
Video games based on Chinese mythology
Action-adventure video games by series
Video games adapted into television shows